Reef Break is a French-American crime drama television series. ABC Studios International is producing the television series for French broadcaster M6, as well as for ABC. The series premiered on June 20, 2019 on ABC in the United States.

On December 13, 2019, ABC cancelled the series after one season.

Cast
 Poppy Montgomery as Cat Chambers, a professional surfer and former associate of the Shorepound criminal syndicate, with whom she worked as a smuggler, money launderer, hustler, con artist, and burglar. Now retired, she returns to Reef Island to take up work as a fixer for the island's government.
 Ray Stevenson as Jake Elliot, an aging federal agent stationed on Reef Island, where his exploits are considered legend. Years earlier, he infiltrated Shorepound and met Cat, whom he wound up marrying; he then got her to turn on her partners and broke up the syndicate. Although he and his wife are now separated, he still helps her out from time to time.
 Desmond Chiam as Det. Wyatt Cole, a newly-promoted detective in the Reef Island police department who pairs up with Cat after they share a one-night stand. He doesn't trust her at first, but gradually comes to realize that she genuinely wants to turn over a new leaf.
 Melissa Bonne as Ana Dumont, Wyatt's half-sister and the deputy governor of Reef Island, who hires Cat to assist the police and occasionally handle problems that the governor's office wants to keep out of the spotlight.
 Tamala Shelton as Petra Torrance, a surfer and thief who hates Cat for her part in the death of her father Mike.
 Joey Vieira as Detective Tolan

Production
The series was announced on May 2, 2018. ABC Studios International is producing the television series for French broadcaster M6. On August 23, 2018, it was announced that ABC had picked up the series for its own 2019 summer schedule. The first season would consist of 13 episodes. On April 10, 2019, it was announced that the series would premiere on ABC in the United States on June 20, 2019.

Reef Break was filmed on the Gold Coast, Queensland, Australia.

Episodes

Reception

Critical response
On Rotten Tomatoes the series has an approval rating of 33% based on 6 reviews, with an average rating of 5/10.

Ratings

References

External links

 
 

2010s American crime drama television series
2010s American police procedural television series
2019 American television series debuts
2019 American television series endings
American Broadcasting Company original programming
English-language television shows
Surfing mass media
Television series by ABC Studios